Paulo Velloso Dantas Az (born 14 January 1963) more commonly known as Paulo Azi is a Brazilian politician as well as a civil engineer and businessman. He has spent his political career representing his home state of Bahia, having served as state representative since 2015.

Personal life
He is the son of Jairo Azi and Julieta Velloso Dantas Azi. He holds a degree in civil engineering from the Federal University of Bahia, graduating in 1986. He earned his postgraduate degree in 1991 from the Catholic University of Salvador.

Political career
Pereira voted in favor of the impeachment motion of then-president Dilma Rousseff. Pereira voted for the 2017 Brazilian labor reform, and would vote against the opening of a corruption investigation into Rousseff's successor Michel Temer.

As a member of the champer of deputies, Azi has campaigned to legalize gambling, arguing that it would help raise tax revenue. He is politically conservative and seen as an ally of Jair Bolsonaro.

References

1963 births
Living people
Brazilian civil engineers 
Liberal Front Party (Brazil) politicians
Democrats (Brazil) politicians
Members of the Chamber of Deputies (Brazil) from Bahia
Members of the Legislative Assembly of Bahia
People from Salvador, Bahia
Federal University of Bahia alumni